Viré-en-Champagne is a commune in the Sarthe department in the region of Pays de la Loire in north-western France. In 2019 it had 195 inhabitants.

See also
Communes of the Sarthe department

References

Communes of Sarthe